Java Village is a hamlet in Wyoming County, New York, United States. Java Village has a post office with ZIP code 14083, which opened in 1826.

References

Hamlets in Wyoming County, New York
Hamlets in New York (state)